The Xfinity Center (originally the Great Woods Center for the Performing Arts and commonly Great Woods) is an outdoor amphitheatre located in Mansfield, Massachusetts. The venue opened during the summer of 1986 with a capacity of 12,000. It was expanded after 2000 to 19,900; 7,000 reserved seats, 7,000 lawn seats and 5,900 general admission seats. The season for the venue is typically from mid May until late September. In 2010, it was named Top Grossing Amphitheater by Billboard. It mainly hosts concerts; other events, such as graduation ceremonies, including that of Mansfield High School, occasionally take place.

History
The venue was proposed by Don Law, John E. Drew and Sherman Wolf in 1985. Originally, the suggested site was in Brookline, Massachusetts. At that time, the venue was planned to be a performing arts center, consisting of concert hall, auditorium and black box theater. After conducting research, Law concluded the New England region was in desperate need of an outdoors venue (at the time, the main outdoor venues were Tanglewood, Cape Cod Melody Tent, and the South Shore Music Circus). The performing arts center plan was changed to an amphitheater. The site was moved to Mansfield to create a regional venue, being within  of Providence, Boston, Worcester and Cape Cod.

The venue opened June 13, 1986 as the Great Woods Center for the Performing Arts; with a performance by Yo-Yo Ma and the Pittsburgh Symphony Orchestra. It was one of the busiest venues in New England, hosting nearly 80 concerts per season. Over the years, additional amphitheaters were added to the region. The Xfinity Theatre in Hartford and the Leader Bank Pavilion in Boston brought competition to the area, bringing the venue to an average of 36 events per season.

In 1998, the owner of venue, Don Law Company, was sold to SFX Entertainment and naming rights were sold to Tweeter Home Entertainment a year later, with the venue now becoming the "Tweeter Center for the Performing Arts". When the electronics retailer faced bankruptcy in 2007, multi-media organization Comcast bought naming rights, with the venue becoming the Comcast Center in 2008. The company renamed the venue "Xfinity Center" in 2014, to correspond with its current product branding.

Naming history
Great Woods Center for the Performing Arts (June 13, 1986—July 8, 1999)
Tweeter Center for the Performing Arts (July 9, 1999—June 3, 2008)
Comcast Center (June 4, 2008—December 31, 2013)
Xfinity Center (January 1, 2014—present)

Notable performances

Aerosmith - have performed here 24 times; their live performance in the film Be Cool was filmed here
The Allman Brothers Band - Live at Great Woods 1992 DVD was filmed here.
Avenged Sevenfold - have played this venue three times, including their first American performance following the death of their drummer The Rev at the Mayhem Festival, with Mike Portnoy playing drums
Jimmy Buffett & The Coral Reefer Band - Portions of Buffett Live: Tuesdays, Thursdays, Saturdays in 1999 and encores in 2008 were recorded here, as well as the Live in Mansfield, MA Soundboard album in 2003.  He has performed at Great Woods 63 times, more than any other artist and it is his most played venue. 
Depeche Mode - have performed here five times; the last show in 2009 was recorded for their live albums project Recording the Universe
The Eagles - performed five consecutive nights on their Hell Freezes Over Tour, a house record
Flyleaf - Family Values 2006 DVD was filmed here.
The Fray - Part of The Fray's music video "All At Once" was filmed here.
Gin Blossoms - Part of their video "As Long as It Matters" was filmed here during the WBCN River Rave on June 8, 1996.
Korn - Family Values 2006 DVD was filmed here.
Spice Girls - performed on July 8, 1998 as part of their Spiceworld Tour.
Nickelback - Part of their music video "Rockstar" was filmed here.
Pearl Jam - have performed here 11 times, including the July 11, 2003 show, the longest show the band has ever played
Phish - A track from 1994's A Live One was recorded here, on the same night they also performed their complete Gamehendge saga. Phish performed at the venue 19 times between 1992 and 2022.
Rush - Two songs from their June 23, 1997 concert, including a full-length performance of "2112", are featured on the live album Different Stages.
The Smiths - Thirteen songs from their August 5, 1986 concert are featured on the 2017 re-release of their LP The Queen is Dead.
Stone Sour - Family Values 2006 DVD was filmed here.
James Taylor - once for four consecutive dates 
The Who - The DVD The Who: Live in Boston was filmed here in September 2002.

See also
 List of contemporary amphitheatres
Live Nation

References

External links
Xfinity Center on Livenation

Amphitheaters in the United States
Buildings and structures in Bristol County, Massachusetts
Mansfield, Massachusetts
Theatres in Massachusetts
Tourist attractions in Bristol County, Massachusetts
Music venues in Massachusetts